The International Association of Online Engineering (IAOE) is an international non-profit organization with the objective of encouraging the wider development, distribution and application of Online Engineering (OE) technologies and its influence to the society. The association seeks to foster practices in education and research in universities, higher education institutions and the industry on OE. Moreover, the IAOE promotes OE for the improvement of living and working conditions. The IAOE encourages the exchange of knowledge as well as the exchange of staff and students between co-operating institutions.

Aim and Vision 

IAOE proclaims a growing complexity of engineering tasks, increasingly specialized and expensive equipment as well as software tools and simulators. It also observes the necessary use of expensive equipment and software tools/simulators in short time projects. As a consequence, it is increasingly necessary to allow and organize a shared use of equipment, but also specialized software as for example simulators.

Aims of the association in general are:
 to bundle the activities of the already existing community in the field of Online Engineering,
 spreading of up to date information and knowledge in the field of Online Engineering,
 organizing conferences and publications,
 provision of different services for the members,
 supporting the development of OE in developing countries.

This includes the promotion of:
 the subject "Online Engineering" at universities and other educational institutions,
 the application of Online Engineering in small and medium enterprises (SMEs),
 the information about Online Engineering solutions especially in the developing countries and for people with special demands,
 networking of the knowhow of the members,
 international projects between the members especially between the universities and the industry,
 quality assurance of Online Engineering in  education and further education programs,
 exchange of scientists and students.

Publications 

The International Journal of Online Engineering is the official publication of IAOE.
It is published quarterly. The association furthermore supports the International Journal of Emerging Technologies in Learning (iJET) and the International Journal of Interactive Mobile Technologies (iJIM). IAOE also runs the scientific journal hosting platform Online-Journals.org, thus aiming at contributing to the advancement of science by providing an efficient and cost-effective way for making qualitative scientific results easily accessible to the largest possible audience.

Conferences 

The annual conference of the International Association of Online Engineering is the International Conference on Remote Engineering and Virtual Instrumentation (REV). Furthermore, IAOE is organizer or co-organizer of the following conferences:
International Conference on Interactive Computer aided Learning (ICL), Conference on Interactive Mobile and Computer aided Learning (IMCL), Conference on Interactive Computer aided Blended Learning (ICBL).

See also
 Electronics
 Online Engineering
 Virtual instrumentation

References

Organizations established in 2006
International professional associations
Engineering organizations
International organisations based in Austria